Senthamarai is a 1962 Indian Tamil-language film, directed by A. Bhimsingh. The film stars Sivaji Ganesan, Padmini, K. R. Ramasamy and S. S. Rajendran. It was released on 14 September 1962. No complete print of the film is known to survive, making it a partially lost film.

Plot

Cast 
Sivaji Ganesan as the village man
Padmini as Senthamarai
K. R. Ramasamy as the lawyer
S. S. Rajendran
Lalitha
Ragini
J. P. Chandrababu
K. A. Thangavelu
B. R. Panthulu

Soundtrack 
The music was composed by Viswanathan–Ramamoorthy. Lyrics were by K. D. Santhanam and Kannadasan.

Reception 
Playing on the film's title meaning red lotus, Kanthan of Kalki caustically called it "Kakidha Poo" (paper flower).

References

External links 
 

1960s lost films
1960s Tamil-language films
1962 films
Films directed by A. Bhimsingh
Films scored by Viswanathan–Ramamoorthy
Lost Indian films